Scottish alternative rock band The Jesus and Mary Chain have released seven studio albums, two live albums, eight compilation albums, two video albums, six extended plays and 21 singles.

Albums

Studio albums

Live albums

Compilation albums

Extended plays

Singles

Other charted songs

Video albums

References

External links
 
 
 
 

Discography
Alternative rock discographies
Discographies of British artists
Rock music group discographies